Christian Müller (born 28 February 1984) is a German former professional footballer who played as a midfielder.

Career
Born in Berlin, Müller began his footballing career aged six with SV Tasmania-Gropiusstadt 1973. In 2001, he joined Hertha BSC.

On 3 February 2007, Müller played his first Bundesliga match for Hertha BSC against Hamburger SV. On 14 January 2008 he signed for fellow Bundesliga club FC Energie Cottbus. Müller was invited to a trial at FC St. Pauli in May 2009. On 7 July 2009, he signed a contract with TuS Koblenz.

In 2016, he was signed by Hungarian first league team Vasas SC. Only a half year later, in December 2016, he signed for German 3. Liga side Preußen Münster for the second leg of the 2016–17 campaign.

Career statistics

1.Relegation playoff.

References

External links
 
 

1984 births
Living people
Footballers from Berlin
German footballers
Germany under-21 international footballers
Association football midfielders
Bundesliga players
2. Bundesliga players
3. Liga players
Hertha BSC players
Hertha BSC II players
FC Energie Cottbus players
FC Energie Cottbus II players
TuS Koblenz players
Arminia Bielefeld players
Vasas SC players
SC Preußen Münster players
Aris Limassol FC players
Expatriate footballers in Hungary
Expatriate footballers in Cyprus